Indira P. P. Bora  is a Satriya dancer from Assam, India. Trained in Bharatnatyam for 13 years under Guru Rukmini Devi Arundale and in Kuchipudi under the guidance of Guru Vempati Chinna Satyam. Bora has promoted and performed Satriya in New Zealand, the United States, and Vietnam.

Awards 
Sangeet Natak Akademi Award, 1996
State Bhishnu Rava Award, 2004
Jonaki Award as distinguished performing female artist.
Senior Fellowship from Department of Culture, Government of India (for Satriya dance)
Padma Shri 2020

References 

1949 births
Living people
People from Golaghat
Dancers from Assam
Sattriya exponents
Recipients of the Sangeet Natak Akademi Award